The Florence County Courthouse and Jail, built in 1889, is an historic complex of governmental buildings located at 501 Lake Street in Florence, Wisconsin. Designed by architect James E. Clancy of Antigo in the Romanesque style, it was built of brick with local sandstone and blue limestone trim and terra cotta roofs. The courthouse cost $13,000 while the 3-cell jail building cost $4,000.

On December 2, 1985, the complex was added to the National Register of Historic Places.

The courthouse is still in use. A south addition was built in 1994. The jail has not been used as such since the 1930s. It is open to the public during the summer months.

References

External links

 Florence County Jail
 Florence County Historical Society: Florence County Courthouse and Jail

Courthouses on the National Register of Historic Places in Wisconsin
Neoclassical architecture in Wisconsin
Government buildings completed in 1889
Buildings and structures in Florence County, Wisconsin
County courthouses in Wisconsin
Tourist attractions in Florence County, Wisconsin
National Register of Historic Places in Florence County, Wisconsin